Laeh Glenn (born 1979) is an American visual artist. She is based in Sebastopol, California. Her work addresses the digital life of an image; namely, how repetition and sharing influence image quality and how painting has the ability to converse with damaged images.

Early life and education
Glenn received a BFA degree in painting from the California College of the Arts in 2008. She later earned an MFA degree in painting from the University of California, Los Angeles in 2012.

Career
Glenn often begins her work with source material found online. Her process involves a “translation…from jpeg to painting” in which Glenn flattens and extracts elements in broad strokes from the reference image. Her paintings recall image compressions that occur when a digital image travels from screen to screen––each painting shifts in tone, texture, or scale. Artforum describes Glenn’s work as “nostalgic yet eerily placeless”.

Key exhibitions 
 2020 Altman Siegel, San Francisco, CA
 2018 Tanya Leighton (Group Exhibition), Berlin, Germany
 2018 Tanya Bonakdar Gallery (Group Exhibition), New York, NY
 2017 Roberts and Tilton (Group Exhibition), Los Angeles, CA
 2016 Palazzo Fruscione, Salerno (Group Exhibition), Italy

Public collections
Glenn’s work is included in the Berkeley Art Museum and Pacific Film Archive.

Awards and residencies
 2017 Rema Hort Mann Foundation Emerging Artist Grant
 2012 Jacob K. Javits Fellowship
 2011 Jacob K. Javits Fellowship

References 

1979 births
Living people
Painters from California
American women painters
21st-century American painters
California College of the Arts alumni
21st-century American women artists